Caprafico is a frazione in the Province of Chieti in the Abruzzo region of Italy. Unusually, its territory belongs to four different municipalities: with the majority in Guardiagrele, just under half in Casoli and smaller portions in Palombaro and Pennapiedimonte. 

Frazioni of the Province of Chieti